St. Peter's Episcopal Church, Niagara Falls, New York, is an Episcopalian church in downtown Niagara Falls, New York.

The first church of the name was built in 1847-49 by George Holley on land given for the purpose from the estate of General Peter Buell Porter; the funeral services of his son Col. Peter A. Porter and other members of his family were held here.

The present church was built in 1873–80 to replace it: the architect was Henry Dudley.

References

Episcopal church buildings in New York (state)
Churches in Niagara Falls, New York